Marilena Georgiou (born 19 June 1996) is a Cypriot footballer who plays as a midfielder for the Cyprus women's national team.

Club career
On 25 September 2008, Georgiou joined Apollon Ladies FC.

International career
Georgiou capped for Cyprus at senior level during the 2017 Aphrodite Cup, including a 1–2 loss to Latvia on 12 March 2017 in which she scored the goal of her team.

References

1996 births
Living people
Women's association football midfielders
Cypriot women's footballers
Cyprus women's international footballers
Apollon Ladies F.C. players
Barcelona FA players